Henrique Walter Pinotti (1929 – June 21, 2010) was a Brazilian physician and gastric surgeon, and a full professor of surgery at the University of São Paulo's Medical School.  He was the author of the book Accesso ao Esôfago Torácico por Transecção Mediana do Diafragma (1999). Pinotti became notable in 1985 by operating on the elected president Tancredo Neves.

Pinotti died of cancer, at age 81, on June 21, 2010, in São Paulo, Brazil.

References

1929 births
2010 deaths
Brazilian surgeons
Brazilian people of Italian descent
Academic staff of the University of São Paulo